Brito or Britto may refer to:

People

Surname 
Alonso Brito (born 1950), Cuban singer/songwriter
Carlos Brito (disambiguation)
Carmen Brito (born 1947), Chilean filmmaker, editor and restorer
Elso Brito (born 1994), Dutch Capeverdian footballer
Fernanda Brito (born 1992), Chilean tennis player
Filipe de Brito e Nicote (c. 1566–1613), Portuguese adventurer, mercenary and viceroy of Syriam
Gary Brito (born 1963 or 1964), American general
Hermenegildo Capelo or Hermenegildo de Brito Capelo (1841–1917), Portuguese explorer
Herminio de Brito (born 1914), Brazilian footballer
Jack Britto (1926–2013), Pakistani Olympic field hockey player
John de Brito (1647–1693), Portuguese Jesuit missionary, martyr and saint
Jorge Horacio Brito (1952–2020), Argentine banker and businessman
Marcos Jose Brito, stage name QBoy, British hip hop artist and DJ
Mario Brito (born 1966), Dominican Republic baseball player
Max Brito (1968–2022), Ivory Coast rugby union player
Michelle Larcher de Brito (born 1993), Portuguese tennis player
Mike Brito (1934–2022), Cuban-American longtime baseball scout for the Los Angeles Dodgers
Petronilho de Brito (1904–1983/4), Brazilian footballer
Radulphus Brito (c. 1270–1320), French grammarian
Romero Britto (born 1963), Brazilian artist, painter, serigrapher and sculptor
Rusty Brito (born 1985), stage name J.R. Writer, Dominican-American rapper
Ruth Britto, American mathematical physicist
Sérgio Britto (born 1959), Brazilian rock keyboardist/singer
Socrates Brito (born 1992), Dominican baseball player
Tiago Brito (born 1991), Portuguese futsal player

Other 
Britto (footballer), Brazilian footballer Herminio de Brito (born 1914) 
Brito (footballer, born 1939), Brazilian footballer Hércules Brito Ruas
Brito (footballer, born 1987), Cape Verdean football forward Armindo Rodrigues Mendes Furtado
William d'Aubigny (Brito), itinerant justice under King Henry I of England

Places 
Brito (Guimarães), Portugal, a civil parish
Brito, California, United States, an unincorporated community
Rio Brito, a river in Nicaragua

See also
Britos, a surname
Estádio Vila Capanema or Estádio Durival de Brito, a football stadium in Curitiba, Brazil
São João de Brito, a civil parish in Lisbon, Portugal

Portuguese-language surnames